La provinciale is a 1981 French-Swiss drama film directed by Claude Goretta. It was entered into the 31st Berlin International Film Festival.

Cast
 Nathalie Baye as Christine
 Angela Winkler as Claire
 Bruno Ganz as Remy
 Patrick Chesnais as Pascal
 Jean Davy as B. de Larive
 Jacques Lalande as the promoter
 Jean Obé as Trabert
 Dominique Paturel as Ralph
 Jean Valmont as Dargeol
 Pierre Vernier as the publisher
 Paul Andrieu as Dangelle
 Jean Bollery as Jacques Legean
 Vincent Grass

References

External links
 

1981 films
Swiss drama films
French drama films
1980s French-language films
1981 drama films
Films directed by Claude Goretta
French-language Swiss films
1980s French films